Milton College was a private college located in Milton, Wisconsin. Founded in 1844 as the Milton Academy, it closed in 1982. Its campus is now part of the Milton Historic District.

History
The college was founded as the Milton Academy (high school) by a group of early Milton settlers, including Milton House owner Joseph Goodrich. Its music department was renowned, and a high percentage of foreign students for the era kept the student body diverse. Although initially many of the students came from Milton, in later years alumni of the college would stay in Milton or return.

Closing
On May 15, 1982, Milton College abruptly closed its doors. At the time, it was Wisconsin's oldest continually operating college. The college's board of trustees had voted 18-2 to close the campus following a notification from the North Central Association of Colleges and Schools that the college's accreditation would be dropped in the fall term; it had previously been on probationary status. The decision from North Central stemmed from the college's continual shaky financial situation, which culminated in a $4 million debt. Milton College had, in fact, been struggling financially since the Great Depression, 50 years earlier. Without accreditation, the college would not have seen any federal loans or grants, adding to an already difficult situation of decreasing student enrollment. Furthermore, it would have no longer been able to compete with schools in the Wisconsin State University System.

Some 135 students had been planning to come back to campus when the school closed, many with only a few credits left until completion of their studies. Officials negotiated with other campuses to accept Milton students.

Milton College transcripts are stored at the University of Wisconsin-Whitewater, located 13 miles from Milton.

Campus life

Athletics
The college was a member of the NAIA and participated in the sports of baseball, basketball and football.

The Milwaukee Bucks chose Milton College's gymnasium as its pre-season training camp in 1968-69. Among the players was Lew Alcindor, who changed his name to Kareem Abdul-Jabbar in 1971.

Football
Milton Wildcats football

Milton fielded its first football team in 1899 and its last in 1981.  No teams were fielded from 1904 to 1915 and from 1943 to 1945.  During this time the college produced seven All-Americans and nine conference titles, in 1935, 1956, 1961, 1964, 1974, 1976, 1978, 1980, and 1981.  The Wildcats played in 419 games during this time with a record of 194–207–18. The school was a member of the Illini-Badger Football Conference from 1976 to 1982.

Greek life
Fraternities
 Alpha Sigma Phi (formerly Alpha Kappa Pi)
 Sigma Pi (formerly Delta Kappa and Chi Delta Rho)
 Tau Kappa Epsilon

No fraternities or sororities were on campus after 1977 due to falling attendance.

Media
The Wildcat - Student newspaper
The Blue and Gold - Student newspaper
Experimental Spectrum - Student newspaper
Milton College Review – Student newspaper
Fides - The college yearbook
WVMC-AM – College radio station 
WMDF-FM – College radio station

Campus adaptive reuse
When the school closed, the buildings were turned over to the banks that kept it alive over the years. Most of the buildings have been converted to commercial or residential use.

 Main Hall is maintained by the Main Hall Preservation Society, and serves as a memorial to the college. Portraits in the building commemorate faculty and alumni over the years.
 The library is now the Shaw Community Center, owned by the City of Milton. It houses both city hall and the Milton Public Library.
 The dorms have been converted into apartment buildings.
 The gymnasium is the home of a local church called The Chapel.

Notable alumni

 Stephen Bolles, U.S. Representative from Wisconsin
 Hellen M. Brooks, educator and Wisconsin State Representative
 Ward Christensen, inventor of XMODEM
 Kerry G. Denson, U.S. National Guard general
 Joseph Dutton, Civil War veteran and later Catholic lay brother and assistant of Father Damien on Molokai.
 Lucy M. Hall (1843-1907), physician, writer
 Adoniram J. Holmes, U.S. Representative from Iowa
 Dave Kraayeveld, former NFL player
 Dave Krieg, former NFL quarterback
 Gilbert L. Laws, U.S. Representative from Nebraska
 Canute R. Matson, Sheriff of Cook County, Illinois at the time of the 1886 Haymarket Square Riot in Chicago 
 Kerwin Mathews, former American actor
 Christopher J. Rollis, newspaper editor and Wisconsin State Representative
 Charles P. Smith, American educator who served as Superintendent of Public Instruction of Wisconsin
 Francis Marion Smith, American business magnate known as "The Borax King"
 Don S. Wenger, U.S. Air Force Major General
 Albert Whitford, astronomer

Notable faculty

 William Clarke Whitford, American educator, legislator, and pastor of the Seventh Day Baptist Church from Wisconsin
 Lorenzo D. Harvey, American educator who served as Superintendent of Public Instruction of Wisconsin
 Edward Searing, American educator who served as Superintendent of Public Instruction of Wisconsin
 Ellsworth Snyder, American abstract painter, professional pianist, conductor and scholar

References

External links
 
 Milton College Preservation Society
 Milton College homecoming featuring former royals
 
 

	

 
Educational institutions established in 1844
Defunct private universities and colleges in Wisconsin
Educational institutions disestablished in 1982
Buildings and structures in Rock County, Wisconsin
School buildings on the National Register of Historic Places in Wisconsin
1844 establishments in Wisconsin Territory
National Register of Historic Places in Rock County, Wisconsin
1982 disestablishments in Wisconsin